The women's 100 metre freestyle S8 event at the 2014 Commonwealth Games as part of the swimming programme took place on 25 July at the Tollcross International Swimming Centre in Glasgow, Scotland.

The medals were presented by Bruce Robertson, Vice-President of the Commonwealth Games Federation and the quaichs were presented by Forbes Dunlop, Chief Executive Officer of Scottish Swimming.

Records
Prior to this competition, the existing world and Commonwealth Games records were as follows.

The following records were established during the competition:

Results

Heats

Final

References

Women's 100 metre freestyle S8
Commonwealth Games
2014 in women's swimming